Black Creek is a stream in the U.S. state of New York. It is a tributary to the Bozen Kill.

Black Creek was named from deposits of black shale in its creek bed.

References

Rivers of Albany County, New York
Rivers of New York (state)